Ishworpur  is a Municipality in Sarlahi District in the Janakpur Zone of south-eastern Nepal. The municipality was established on 18 May 2014 by merging the existing Bela, Bhaktipur, Gaurishankar and Ishwarpur VDCs. At the time of the 1991 Nepal census it had a population of 14,014 people living in 249 individual households.

Literacy 
Nowadays, with the help of social awareness programs operated by many NGOs, government, media & many locals literacy rate is increasing.

Media 
To promote local culture, Ishwarpur has one FM radio station Samudayik Radio ekata - 92.4 MHz It is a Community radio Station which among others is more popular in this area.

References

External links
UN map of the municipalities of Sarlahi  District

Populated places in Sarlahi District
Municipalities in Madhesh Province
Nepal municipalities established in 2014